Michael Chiarello (born January 26, 1962) is an American celebrity chef specializing in Italian-influenced California cuisine. He hosts the cooking show Easy Entertaining with Michael Chiarello on  Food Network and hosts NapaStyle on Fine Living Network. Chiarello owns a winery called Chiarello Family Vineyards, located in Yountville, CA. He is also the owner of Coqueta, which has two locations: one in Napa Valley, California, and one in San Francisco, California. Along with Coqueta, he owns and cooks for Bottega, located in Napa Valley.  Michael also owns NapaStyle, also located in Yountville, CA which sold a "selection of exclusive drinkware, serveware, designer tabletop pieces, and more.", but closed on January 4, 2016. Chiarello was a competitor on the fourth season of The Next Iron Chef. In spring 2013, Michael opened Coqueta, a tapas restaurant on San Francisco's waterfront. In March 2016, two former employees filed lawsuits alleging sexual harassment and labor law violations; the sexual harassment lawsuit was settled in 2017.

Early life and career

Born to an Italian-American family, Chiarello rose to prominence at a young age. After graduating from the Culinary Institute of America in 1982, he studied hospitality management at Florida International University, receiving his bachelor's degree in 1984. The next year, he opened The Grand Bay Hotel in Coconut Grove, Florida, and Toby's Bar and Grill. He was honored as 1985's Chef of the Year by Food & Wine Magazine.

Later in the 1980s, Chiarello moved back to his home state of California, making his home in the Napa Valley. One of his first endeavors was chef at The Heritage Restaurant in Turlock which failed and went bankrupt. He opened the Tra Vigne restaurant, creating a menu influenced by the cuisine of his family's native Calabria and rife with local seasonal ingredients. He has since served as executive chef in numerous American restaurants including Caffe Museo in San Francisco, Ajax Tavern and Bump's in Aspen, Colorado, and Bisect in Scottsdale, Arizona.

Sexual Harassment 

In March 2016, two former employees filed two lawsuits against Chiarello, alleging sexual harassment and labor law violations. In 2017, the sexual harassment lawsuit was settled for an undisclosed amount.

Media career

His first cooking show, Season by Season, debuted on PBS in 2001. He hosted two more series for PBS, Michael Chiarello's Napa and Michael Chiarello's Napa: Casual Cooking over the next two years before moving to the Food Network to host Easy Entertaining in 2003. In 2004, Chiarello's latest show, NapaStyle, premiered on the Food Network's sister network Fine Living Network. Chiarello was included as a contestant on Top Chef Masters, winning his preliminary round and advancing to the championship round, placing second to Rick Bayless (first place).

Reruns of Easy Entertaining now appear on Food Network's sister network Cooking Channel.

In 2011, Chiarello appeared in the Visit California promotional film aimed at boosting tourism from the UK.

Personal life

In 2003, Chiarello married Eileen Marie Gordon; with whom he has one son, Aidan, born in 2005. He has three daughters, Margaux, Felicia, and Giana from his previous marriage. In 2019, Chiarello filed for divorce from Gordon.

Cookbooks
 "Michael Chiarello's Live Fire: 125 Recipes for Cooking Outdoors"  (May 1, 2013) by Michael Chiarello, Claudia Sansone and Ann Krueger Spivack photography by Frankie Frankeny
 Michael Chiarello's Bottega (2010), photography Frankie Frankeny
 At Home with Michael Chiarello (2005)
 Michael Chiarello’s Casual Cooking (2002)
 Napa Stories (2001)
 Tra Vigne Cookbook (1999)
 Flavored Oils and Flavored Vinegars (1995; revised edition 2006)

References

Footnotes

Sources
 "Michael's Bio". NapaStyle. Retrieved August 17, 2009.
 "Michael on TV". NapaStyle. Retrieved August 17, 2009.
 "Michael Chiarello: Bio". Food Network. Retrieved August 17, 2009.
 "". Cooking Channel. Retrieved December 19, 2010.

External links
 Official Website
 NapaStyle (defunct)
 Chiarello Family Vineyards
 NapaStyle Wine Club
 Paradigm Interview
 Michael Chiarello Interview on Sidewalks Entertainment
 Michael Chiarello at the Chef and Restaurant Database

1962 births
Living people
American male chefs
American people of Italian descent
People from Red Bluff, California
People from Yountville, California
Florida International University alumni
Culinary Institute of America alumni
American television chefs
Food Network chefs
Chefs of Italian cuisine